Stephen J. Adler (born 1955) is an American journalist. He was editor-in-chief of Reuters from 2011 to 2021.

Early life
Stephen Adler was born in 1955. His father, Norman, was a high school English department chairman, and his mother, Mildred, was a writer and social worker. He graduated from Harvard University in 1977 and from Harvard Law School in 1983.

Career
He began his career as a reporter for Tampa Times and Tallahassee Democrat. He joined The American Lawyer in 1983, then in 1988 joined The Wall Street Journal as legal editor. He was promoted to assistant managing editor in 1998 and to deputy managing editor in 2000.

He was editor-in-chief of BusinessWeek from 2005 to 2009. During his five-year tenure, the magazine and its website won more than 100 awards.

He joined Thomson Reuters in 2010 as senior vice president and editorial director of the company’s Professional Division. He was named editor-in-chief of Reuters News and an executive vice president for Thomson Reuters in 2011, where he directed the editorial operations and news strategy for the company. Adler was named president and editor-in-chief of Reuters in December 2012. In 2018, he spoke out against the arrest and conviction of two Reuters journalists in Myanmar. He retired from Reuters in 2021.

Adler is chairman of the board of the Reporters Committee for Freedom of the Press, and is chairman of the Columbia Journalism Review. In addition, he serves on the boards of the Thomson Reuters Foundation and the Committee to Protect Journalists. He is a member of the Gerald Loeb Award's board of final judges and the Council on Foreign Relations.

Publications
Adler is author of the book The Jury: Trial and Error in the American Courtroom, which won the Silver Gavel Award from the American Bar Association. With his wife, novelist Lisa Grunwald, he was co-editor of Letters of the Century: America 1900—1999, Women’s Letters: America from the Revolutionary War to the Present, and The Marriage Book.

References

1955 births
Living people
American business writers
American legal writers
American magazine editors
Harvard Law School alumni
21st-century American historians
21st-century American male writers
American male non-fiction writers